My Roaring 20's is the second studio album by American rock group Cheap Girls. It was released on October 9, 2009, through Paper + Plastick. The album was produced by Rick Johnson and the group.

Recording
Recording for the album began in February 2009 at Rick Johnson's studio.

Release
The album was released on October 9, 2009. On August 2, 2012, it was announced that future pressings of My Roaring 20's would be released by Asian Man Records.

Track listing

References

2009 albums
Cheap Girls albums